Swept Away is the debut solo album by noted session guitarist Steve Hunter. It was released on the Atco Records label in 1977, and was produced by Bob Ezrin and Brian Christian after Jerry L. Greenberg, the President of Atlantic Records, approached Hunter about doing a solo album.

Track listing
All tracks composed by Steve Hunter; except where indicated

Side one
"Eight Miles High" (Gene Clark, James McGuinn, David Crosby) 
"Eldorado Street" 
"Goin' Down" (Traditional/Don Nix; arranged by Steve Hunter)
"Rubber Man"
"Of All the Times to Leave"

Side two
"Jasper St. Viaduct Gitar Rag" 
"Sail On Sailor" (Ray Kennedy, Tandyn Almer, Jack Rieley, Van Dyke Parks, Brian Wilson)
"Swept Away" 
"Sea Sonata" 
"Deep Blue"

Personnel
Steve Hunter - all guitars, vocals
Prakash John - bass
Jim Gordon - drums
Bob Ezrin - keyboards, percussion, vocals, producer
With:
Jim Maelen - percussion
Jozef Chirowski - Fender Rhodes on "Eldorado Street"
Dr. C. Ezrin M.D. F.R.C.P. (C) F.A.C.P. professor of medicine, University of Toronto - upright bass
Carol Pope, Joanne Brooks, Tony D'Amico - vocals
Technical
Don Punchatz - cover illustration
Don Exeley - back cover photo
Lynn Breslin, Bob Defrin - art direction

References

Swept Away, Steve Hunter. Atco SD 36-148 (1977) (liner notes)

External links
Swept Away on Steve Hunter's official website

1977 debut albums
Steve Hunter albums
Atco Records albums
Albums produced by Bob Ezrin